Edward Fitzherbert may refer to:

 Edward Fitzherbert (British Army officer) (1885–1979), British Army officer and cricketer
 Edward Fitzherbert, 13th Baron Stafford (1864–1941), English peer and Royal Navy officer